Patrick Koffi (born October 16, 2001) is an American professional soccer player who plays as a forward for French Championnat National 2 club US Lusitanos on loan from Paris FC.

Club career
Koffi made his professional debut with Paris FC in a 1–1 Ligue 2 tie with Troyes on March 6, 2020.

In July 2021, Koffi joined third-tier side Créteil on loan. On February 1, 2022, he was recalled from loan.

Personal life
Koffi was born in the United States and he is of Ivorian descent. He moved to France at the age of 15 when he joined the youth system of Paris FC.

Career statistics

References

External links
 

2001 births
Soccer players from Dallas
American people of Ivorian descent
Living people
American soccer players
Association football forwards
Paris FC players
US Créteil-Lusitanos players
US Lusitanos Saint-Maur players
Ligue 2 players
Championnat National players
Championnat National 2 players
Championnat National 3 players
American expatriate soccer players
American expatriate sportspeople in France
Expatriate footballers in France